Ricardo Nuno Pinto Pinheiro da Silva (born 12 May 1980) is a retired Portuguese football player.

Club career
He made his professional debut in the Segunda Liga for Desportivo das Aves on 30 April 2005 in a game against Leixões.

References

1980 births
Footballers from Porto
Living people
Portuguese footballers
Ermesinde S.C. players
FC Porto B players
F.C. Lixa players
C.D. Aves players
Liga Portugal 2 players
F.C. Marco players
G.D. Tourizense players
AC Vila Meã players
Amarante F.C. players
C.D. Cinfães players
AD Fafe players
F.C. Arouca players
Moreirense F.C. players
Varzim S.C. players
A.D. Sanjoanense players
Association football goalkeepers